Siboney may refer to:

Arts
 Siboney (film), a Mexican-Cuban drama film
 "Siboney" (song), a 1929 song by Ernesto Lecuona
 Siboney, a 1985 album by Slim Gaillard

Places
 Siboney, Cuba, a town in eastern Cuba
 Siboney, Oklahoma, a town absorbed by the town of Manitou, Oklahoma
 Siboney, a neighborhood in Playa, Havana in Cuba

Other uses
 The Ciboney or Siboney, an indigenous people of Cuba
 Siboney (rum), a brand of rums
 Siboney de Cuba, a cattle breed
 , two U.S. Navy ships of the name